Erik Clinton Westrum (born July 26, 1979 in Minneapolis, Minnesota) is an American former professional ice hockey center who played in the National Hockey League (NHL) for the Phoenix Coyotes, Minnesota Wild, and Toronto Maple Leafs.

Playing career
Westrum was drafted by the Phoenix Coyotes with their 7th pick, 187st overall, in the 1998 NHL Entry Draft. At the time he was playing in the NCAA for the University of Minnesota. Erik played the next four years with the Gophers. After completing his college career he moved to the Springfield Falcons of the AHL for the 2001/2002 season. With the Falcons he played 199 games, scoring 106 points, 37 goals and 69 assists.

Westrum made his NHL debut with Phoenix during the 2003–04 NHL season, playing 15 games with 2 points, one goal and one assist. After the NHL season he played an important role in helping Team USA win the bronze medal in the 2004 Men's World Ice Hockey Championships in Prague, Czech Republic. He scored the winning goal to secure the Bronze medal in a shootout while leading the tournament in face-off percentage and was one of the tournament leaders in scoring.

After making an impact with the Phoenix Coyotes in the 2003-2004 NHL season, Westrum was forced to sign a contract with the Utah Grizzlies in the AHL due to the 2004 NHL lockout. With this team he played 80 games with 18 goals and 15 assists, for a total of 33 points. In the season 2005–06 Erik Westrum signed a two-way contract with Minnesota Wild in the NHL after a trade sent him from Phoenix and to his home state of Minnesota.  The Wild exchanged Zbynek Michalek for the Coyote's Erik Westrum. But the second experience in the top North America league lasted for only 10 games with one assist. He finished the season with the Wild's farm team, the Houston Aeros. He played 71 games with 98 points, finishing second on the team behind Kirby Law's 110 points.

At the end of 2006 season he signed as a free agent with the Toronto Maple Leafs in July, 2006, joining Minnesota Gophers teammate John Pohl, already with the Leafs. With Toronto, Westrum played two games scoring no points. As Captain of the Leafs top farm-team, the Toronto Marlies in the American Hockey League, he finished as the team's top scorer with 58 points (23 goals and 35 assist).

After six professional seasons in North America Westrum signed his first European contract in the Swiss League with the HC Ambri-Piotta. After an explosive start with Ambri-Piotta he signed a four-year contract extension on May 15, 2009. In the first year in Ambrì he became a fan favorite thanks to his spectacular league leading play.

International play

 
He has represented Team USA at the  2004 Men's World Ice Hockey Championships where Team USA won the bronze medal. Westrum scored the game-winning goal in a shootout to secure the Bronze medal against Slovakia and his future teammate Marian Gaborik of the Minnesota Wild.

Career statistics

Regular season and playoffs

International

Awards and honors

Golden Gopher Award Winners

 Frank Pond Rookie of the Year Award, season 1997–98.
 Dr. V. George Nagobads Unsung Hero Award second place, season 1998–99.
 John Mariucci MVP, season 1999–00.
 Tom Mohr Playoff MVP, season 1999–00.
 John Mariucci MVP, season 2000–01.
 Tom Mohr Playoff MVP, season 2000–01.

References

External links

1979 births
Living people
American men's ice hockey centers
HC Ambrì-Piotta players
Houston Aeros (1994–2013) players
Ice hockey people from Minneapolis
Minnesota Golden Gophers men's ice hockey players
Minnesota Wild players
Phoenix Coyotes players
Springfield Falcons players
Toronto Maple Leafs players
Toronto Marlies players
Utah Grizzlies (AHL) players
Arizona Coyotes draft picks